The women's lightweight is a competition featured at the 2013 World Taekwondo Championships, and was held at the Exhibition Center of Puebla in Puebla, Mexico on July 18. Llightweights were limited to a maximum of 62 kilograms in body mass.

Medalists

Results

Finals

Top half

Section 1

Section 2

Bottom half

Section 3

Section 4

References

Entry List
Draw
Results
Results Book Pages 771–787

Women's 62
Worl